Ashrafiyya may refer to:

 , an Islamic school of scholars like al-Mizzi in 12 CE Damascus
 Madrasa al-Ashrafiyya, a school built in c. 1481 on the western border of the Haram al-Sharif, Jerusalem
 Al-Ashrafiyya, a Palestinian Arab village in the District of Baysan

See also 
 Ashrafiya (disambiguation)